Adoxophyes trirhabda is a species of moth of the family Tortricidae. It is found in Papua New Guinea.

References

Moths described in 1969
Adoxophyes
Moths of New Guinea